Timothy Allan Rave (born July 24, 1967) is an American politician and a former Republican member of the South Dakota Senate representing District 25 from January 11, 2011, to April 1, 2015. Rave served consecutively in the South Dakota Legislature from January 2003 until January 11, 2011, in the South Dakota House of Representatives District 25 seat.

He was Speaker of the House. He is currently the Chairman of the Republican Party in South Dakota.

References

External links 
Official page at the South Dakota Legislature

Timothy Rave at Ballotpedia
Tim Rave at the National Institute on Money in State Politics

Place of birth missing (living people)
Living people
Republican Party members of the South Dakota House of Representatives
People from Minnehaha County, South Dakota
Republican Party South Dakota state senators
1967 births
21st-century American politicians